The Dennis and Christine Garrison House is a historic house at 105 Garrison Road in Greenbrier, Arkansas.  It is a single story frame structure, finished in a veneer of stone and brick in 1951 by Silas Owens, Sr., a local master mason.  The house has a number of hallmarks of Owens' work, including cream brick trim around the building corners and the openings of doors and windows, and an arched entrance porch.  The herringbone patterns in the stonework are also an Owens signature.  The chimney, with similar styling, was added by Owens' son Silas Jr.

The house was listed on the National Register of Historic Places in 2005.

See also
National Register of Historic Places listings in Faulkner County, Arkansas

References

Houses on the National Register of Historic Places in Arkansas
Houses completed in 1951
Houses in Faulkner County, Arkansas
National Register of Historic Places in Faulkner County, Arkansas